Aleksandar Linta (Serbian Cyrillic: Александар Линта; born 22 October 1975) is a Serbian football manager and former player.

Biography

Linta started training football when he was 11 years old and came through the youth system of FK Zemun. During this period, Zemun had a youth training system that was one of the best in Serbia and provided football with several outstanding players like Nenad Džodić, Milan Milijaš, Ivan Litera and Predrag Ristović who were also teammates with Linta. Linta, Džodić and Milijaš also played together in former Yugoslavia Youth National teams (U15, U16, U17, U18).

When he was only 16 years old, Linta signed his first professional contract with FK Zemun. At the age of 21, Linta moved to Iceland to play for IA Akranes that was a consecutive five-time champion. Playing for IA Akranes, he made it to the qualifying round of the Champions League with the team, however, they were defeated by Košice (1-0 and 3-0). During his time in Iceland, where he played for five different clubs in the period from 1997 to 2011 he scored 28 goals in 227 games. During this timeframe he laso played for different clubs in Serbia (FK Mladost Apatin and FK Zemun) and Montenegro (FK Zeta).

Linta began his career as a coach in Iceland with FC Grundarfjördur, where he was also a player, after which he continued his career as an assistant in the following clubs: FK Voždovac, Serbia National Team U16 and U17 and FK Vojvodina.

In 2018, Linta was the assistant to Ilija Stolica in NK Olimpija and even took the team over as head coach after Stolica left the team during the same year. He had noticeable results in UEFA Europe League - in the second qualification round NK Olimpija won against Crusaders (5-1, 1-1) and in the third qualification round they won against HJK (3-0, 4-1). However, they were eliminated in the Play-off round, when Spartak Trnava won (0-2, 1-1). This was the best achievement of NK Olimpija in UEFA Cups so far.

Linta is moving to Kazakhstan in 2019 where he was assistant coach in FC Irtysh Pavlodar. Due to financial issues and bankruptcy, the club had to step down from the League and at that point Linta left the team.

Since 2020, he is the manager of Radnički 1923 in Serbian First League.

Sports career

References

1975 births
Living people
Serbian footballers
Serbian football managers
Association footballers not categorized by position